Finland has participated in the Eurovision Young Dancers 11 times since its debut in 1985. Finland has hosted the contest once, in 1991.

Participation overview

Hostings

See also
Finland in the Eurovision Song Contest
Finland in the Eurovision Young Musicians

External links 
 Eurovision Young Dancers

Countries in the Eurovision Young Dancers
Finnish music